Beaufort-Orbagna is a commune in the Jura department in the region of Bourgogne-Franche-Comté in eastern France. It was established on 1 January 2019 by merger of the former communes of Beaufort (the seat) and Orbagna.

See also
Communes of the Jura department

References

Communes of Jura (department)
Populated places established in 2019
2019 establishments in France